Kimarra McDonald (born 14 August 1987) is a Jamaican middle-distance runner. She competed in the women's 800 metres at the 2017 World Championships in Athletics.

References

External links

1987 births
Living people
Jamaican female middle-distance runners
World Athletics Championships athletes for Jamaica
Place of birth missing (living people)